Pablo Bofill (born 1980 in Paris) is a French architecture firm executive. As of 2022, he is the co-head of Ricardo Bofill Taller de Arquitectura (RBTA) in Barcelona, jointly with his half-brother Ricardo Emilio Bofill.

Life

Pablo Bofill is the son of architect Ricardo Bofill and visual artist Annabelle d'Huart. He studied at ESADE in Barcelona in the early 2000s. He became chief executive of RBTA in 2009.

In June 2014 he married Colombian designer Melissa Losada; they later divorced. He is the father of two children, Luca (born 2018) and Athena Sol (born 2021), the latter with Argentine visual artist Luna Paiva whom he married in 2022.

See also
 List of works by Ricardo Bofill Taller de Arquitectura

Notes

Living people
1980 births
ESADE alumni